Thallumaala  is a 2022 Indian Malayalam-language action film directed by Khalid Rahman and produced by Ashiq Usman. It is written by Muhsin Parari and Ashraf Hamza. The film stars Chris shimson Raj, Kalyani Priyadarshan and Shine Tom Chacko.

Principal photography commenced in October 2021. It was released on 12 August 2022 and received positive reviews from critics and audience, becoming a critical and commercial success.

Plot

Narrative structure 
Thallumaala's narrative is told out of chronological order and follows 9 chapters which happen in different timelines and begins to shift from one chapter to another and moves to the last chapter for the conclusion.

Adisthana Souhrdam 
Adivech Munnott 
Adiyi Aananda Kaalam
Adijeevana Margangal
Adiyanthiravastha 
Adi Nirthal Prakhyapanam
Melodyaal Meladi
Adisthana Souhrdam 2 
Adikkuripp

Summary 
The narrative begins with a fight between Wazim and S.I. Reji in a garage, where Wazim narrates about the fight, which happened 2 years back during Wazim's wedding with popular vlogger Fathima Beepaathu Beevi. Due to the fight, Wazim becomes an infamous internet celebrity with the title Manavaalan. Two years before, Wazim meets his friends - Jamshi, Vikas and Rajesh. The friendship between Jamshi and Wazim begun due to a fight in a Masjid that happened due to Wazim stepping on Jamshi's shoes. Later they both, along with Wazim's old friend Sathar, leave for a football match, which is interrupted by the fight between Vikas and Rajesh. As the trio joins in the fight, the friendship circle expanded.

Few days later, Wazim's father Abdullah runs a cinema theatre, where he meets Beepaathu and they become friends. Beepathu invites Wazim for a shop inauguration, but couldn't attend due to the fights with Jamshi, Vikas, and Rajesh. Later the friends meet Omega Babu to settle the score for Jamshi, but they couldn't settle the score as Wazim slapped Siyad, with whom Wazim has another score to settle. Later, Sathar brings Beepathu to Wazim's theatre to watch a film, but Siyad and his gang intervene, where another fight erupts, leading to the theatre's destruction. Eventually, Wazim was sent to Dubai.

Two years later, Wazim returns home and meets Beepathu again. The duo fall in love and decide to get married. One day, Wazim's friends gets involved in another fight with  Reji's gang, which leads to severe wounds for Wazim's gang. Reji tries to patch up things but leads to another fight during Wazim's wedding. This fight breaks Wazim's marriage and Wazim is sent back to Dubai again. Two years later, Wazim is an internet celebrity, who returns back home and learns that Beepathu is getting engaged to another person.

Meanwhile, Reji meets Wazim to settle the score of the wedding fight. A hand-to-hand combat ensues, where Reji defeats Wazim. Now a changed and happy man, Reji decides to reunite Wazim and Beepathu. They leave to Dubai to meet Beepathu and stop her engagement. When they arrive at the marriage venue to meet Beepathu, Omega Babu walks in-between as they see Beepathu sitting by poolside. Another fight erupts between Wazim's gang and Omega Babu, to settle the score for Jamshi. Beepathu, who witnesses the fight, manages to slip away from the venue. After settling the score, Wazim runs behind Beepathu, lovingly asking her to stop.

Cast

Production 

In an interview, Muhsin Parari stated that: "After the box office failure of KL 10 Patthu, I wanted to make a film that meets what I couldn't pull off in KL 10 Patthu. I signed up with Sameer Thahir and Ashraf Hamza for my next directorial. I discussed with Ashraf hamza that my drive is to make a film in same flavor as of KL 10 Patthu but one that attract people to theatres. Suddenly the name 'thallumaala popped up in my brain from nowhere, and we decided to make it as a chain of fights that presented in a musical way."

Thallumaala was announced in October 2019 with Aashiq Abu and Rima Kallingal as the producers. Sushin Shyam would do the music, and Tovino Thomas and Soubin Shahir were announced as the lead actors at that time. Later in February 2020, Muhsin Parari announced that he would do the script part only, and Khalid Rahman would be the film director. Ashiq Usman replaced Aashiq Abu and Rima Kallingal as the producer.

Soubin Shahir also dropped out of the project and Shine Tom Chacko came as the replacement in February 2020. It was reported that Rex Vijayan and Shahabaz Aman would join as music directors with Sushin Shyam working only on the background score. In February 2021, it has been reported that Kalyani Priyadarshan is cast as the heroine of the film. Principal photography of the film commenced with a pooja function on 12 October 2021. It was confirmed that Vishnu Vijay will handle music and background score.

 Music 

The soundtrack accompanied for the film has eight songs in number. The Malayalam lyrics were penned by Muhsin Parari while the English rap verses featured in the song "Kannil pettole" was penned by Irfana Hameed, a popular hip-hop musician from Kodaikanal. Vijay, Benny Dayal, Haricharan, Shakthisree Gopalan, Irfana Hameed, Hrithik Jayakish, Neha Girish, Eshaan Sanil, Thejas Krishna, Shenbagaraj, Santhosh Hariharan, Sreeraj as well as Salim Kumar, Tovino Thomas, Khalid Rahman, Binu Pappu, Gokulan, Lukman Avaran and Muhsin Parari gave vocals for the tracks featured in the album.
The soundtrack is influenced by traditional Muslim musical styles of Northern Kerala and consisted of various genres and moods being incorporated. It was released on 16 August 2022 by Muzik 247. The album also features a promotional song titled "Manavalan Thug" written and performed by Dabzee and SA, composed by Dabzee, which was not included in the film but was listed in the original soundtrack album.
The soundtrack album received positive feedback from music listeners and critics, appreciating Vishnu Vijay for his compositions and Muhsin Parari for the catchy and fresh lyrics. It was positioned No:10 in "Global Debutant" chart on Spotify over the weekend August 19 to 21, 2022.

An additional track titled Manasakamil - Manavalan Unleashed was released by Muzik 247 on 10 January 2023.

 Background and production 

Vishnu Vijay got involved in the project while he was working on the 2021 film Bheemante Vazhi, directed by Ashraf Hamza, who co-wrote the screenplay of Thallumaala with Muhsin Parari. Bheemante Vazhi also featured songs written by Muhsin Parari. "The two projects went in parallel with same people on board, At a time we had a confusion which film we were working." - said Vishnu Vijay.

In an interview with Club FM, Muhsin Parari stated that: "Both me and Vishnu Vijay likes wordplay or pun, we used a lot of puns in the movie. What lacks in Thallumaala soundtrack is melody, and we used to tell melody is the only 'Adi' missing here. The idea of the track 'Ole melody''' evolved straight from this thought. Among all those fights he had, the most impactful blow he ever received was her melody. We composed this thought and included some Qawwali elements to make the song." In another interview Muhsin said that the music notes "SaMa GaMa SaMa GaRiMa" from the song can also be read literally, which cites a meaning "Equal Dignity, Equal Pride".

About Thallumaala paattu, Muhsin said: "from the time we conceived the idea of the movie, I was certain about this track. All the lead male characters should be introduced through this one. But I haven't decided to write the song myself as I was supposed to be the director of the movie that time, and I wasn't confident enough to do all the jobs by myself. When Khalid Rahman replaced me as director, he insisted me to write this song. The name "thallumaala" comes from the folk term "maala". This is a ballad of fights, and I took it literally to write this song."

In addition to his acting role, Tovino Thomas sang the track "Tupathu", an offbeat Rap song with Shakthisree Gopalan. The track "Kannil Pettole" is a peppy number with Arabic and Hip hop elements. Irfana Hameed, a popular hip hop musician from Kodaikanal, who penned and rapped the English verses. "Ndakkippattu" is a dance number in which the vocal department consists mostly of the actors who appear on the song.
K. D. Vincent acted as the music coordinator of the project. Songs and score were recorded at 2 bar Q Studios, Chennai.

 Track listing 

 Original Soundtrack 
An original soundtrack album composed and produced by Vishnu Vijay was released on 4 October 2022.

 Promotional track 
A promotional song titled "Manavaalan Thug" composed by Dabzee, written and performed by Dabzee & SA, members of Malayalam Hip hop band 'Manushyar', was released on Muzik 247's YouTube channel on 10 August 2022. The song was written in native Malabar slang with English rap verses.
In an interview with manorama, Dabzee stated about the track: "The (thallumaala) team listens to this song after the film's censoring and so on. This track was done in about ten days...I wrote four lines of the song first. This was one of many independent tracks to be constructed by us. One of the Thallumala team happened to hear it. Later Khalid Rahman and Muhsin Parari were calling me. Perhaps the first recorded Malabari slang and swag connected them."
A Nike shoes reference in the lines "Suggundaymoru Seriyundu" was pointed out by many listeners. But Dabzee said:
The track gathered highly positive reviews and went on to become a sensational hit across various social media platforms.

 Reception 
The soundtrack album received positive reviews from both critics and audience. Nirmal Jovial of The Week wrote: "Thallumaala is a success as a great musical also. Songs are effectively used at various junctures in the plot. Muhsin Parari does pure magic with his lyrics, especially in the songs 'Ole Melody' and 'Ndaakkippattu'. Vishnu Vijays's music is so fresh and energetic." Behindwoods wrote that "For the new Gen music lovers, Thallumaala will be a treat. The film is peppered with impromptu situational songs with beats as popping as the frames of the music video and lyrics that are conversational and hilarious." A critique from Music Aloud stated that "Thallumaalas music is radically different from anything that Vishnu Vijay has produced in Malayalam movies thus far, and it is great to see him absolutely nail it in a new territory. He has some solid support from Muhsin Parari, of course. And a hat tip to Dabzee and SA as well, for their outstanding guest composition."
The song "Thallumaala paattu" positioned No:4 on Top Viral 50 Global Charts of Spotify, on 21 August 2022. The soundtrack album was positioned No:10 in "Global Debutant" chart on Spotify over the weekend August 19 to 21.

 Music Video 
First song from the movie "Kannil pettole", featuring Tovino Thomas and Kalyani Priyadarshan was released on 3 May 2022. The video garnered attention for its vibrant and colorful picturization. The video was also noted for a dancing Tovino Thomas, probably the first time in his career.

The lyric video of "Ole melody" was released on 4 July 2022, and the music video was out on 19 August 2022. The video song featured actor Salim Kumar in a special appearance, who also had a vocal contribution in the song.

The lyric video of "Thallumaala paattu" was released on 24 July 2022. The video featured some clips of the action scenes from the movie got instant attention and went viral on the internet.

The song video of "Ndaakkippaattu" was released on 1 August 2022. The video featured dance performances by Tovino Thomas, Shine Tom Chacko, Binu Pappu, Gokulan, Lukman Avaran, Adri Joe, Austin Dan and Swathi Das Prabhu. Choreographed by Shobi Paulraj, the video was received well by the viewers for the dance steps and actors' performances.

The song video of "Tupathu", A rap song featuring Tovino Thomas and Kalyani Priyadarshan was released after the movie completed 4 days run in theatre.  Even though the song's placement in the movie got mixed responses, the video alone was well received.

The first composed but never recorded version of Ndaakkippaattu was used in the 'night-before-wedding' scene in the movie. The unreleased song titled as Ole Kolaayi differ considerably from the recorded version. The song was clubbed together with a stanza of Chakkara Chundil (a music single by singer Shafi Kollam, who also got an acting part in the scene) and picturized. The scene was conceived as two rival gangs singing and celebrating together, while a great tension evolves between them. This sequence was released as a music video titled "Chakkara Chundil" on Muzik 247's YouTube channel, on 22 August 2022.

The music video of the promotional track "Manavalan Thug"  was released on 10 August 2022. The video was directed by Suhail Backer and featured Tovino Thomas and singers Dabzee and SA. Along with the soundtrack, The music video of Manavalan Thug also went viral and gained 13 million views in 1 month on YouTube.

 Marketing 
In August 2022, a trailer show was held on the outer wall of Dubai Festival City Mall. The film's title was written using laser technology on the water fountain. This was the first time that a Malayalam film is drawing a picture in water as part of its promotion.
On August 10, The cast were supposed to visit the HiLITE Mall in Calicut for the promotion of the movie. However, crowd had turned out in huge numbers at the venue, which made the makers cancel the promotional event.

A promotional song titled "Manavaalan Thug" written, composed and performed by Dabzee & SA was released on Muzik 247's YouTube channel on 10 Aug 2022.

 Release Thallumaala was released worldwide on 12 August 2022. The satellite and digital rights were sold to Surya TV and Netflix respectively. The film began streaming on Netflix on 11 September 2022.

 Reception 
 Box office 
The film was a commercial success and turned out to be the highest grossing Tovino Thomas film yet. In the opening day, the film grossed 7.4 crore and 15 crore from the first and second day worldwide. On its fourth day, the film grossed 31 crore at the box office overtaking the lifetime collections of Tovino's other three ventures of 2022, Vaashi, Dear Friend and Naaradan within its opening day.

Critical responseThallumaala received positive reviews from critics and audience with praise on its narrative style, songs, musical scores, cast performance, fight choreography in action sequences and making style, While some audience criticized the film's story.

Nirmal Jovial of The Week rated the movie 4/5 stars and said, "With a strong script—complemented by a strong flavour of Malabar—it delivers what it promises in its title and more. Thallumaala is a film with a nonlinear narrative structure with the plot divided into different chapters. Rahman uses this narrative structure to give the audience a parallel view of the present and the past of the protagonist. This also ensures no drop in the film's energy in either of the halves. The script by Ashraf Hamza and Muhsin Parari is top-notch."

Cris of The News Minute called the movie "loud, cartoonish and fun" and rated it 3.5/5 stars. "It is experimental with a capital E. You can either enjoy it, or understand that this is something appreciable and just not your kind of thing. But if you are the curious kind, you'd want to know just what the H this is all about. Princy Alexander of Onmanorama reviewed the movie as "A fun ride anchoring on new gen vibe" and said, "Thallumala is more of a jovial experiment in terms of technique and narrative. The use of technology and graphics resonates well with the youth who can also relate to the characters because of their spontaneity and their lack of fear of consequences."

S.R. Praveen of The Hindu gave praise for its action sequences and technical craft, but mentioned the lack of substance in the narrative and the same craftily hidden with non-linear style and the relentless fight-song-fight routine that would render one without a breathing space to think.

Controversies
 Manhandling Incident 
On 7 March 2022, two people have admitted to a hospital claiming Shine Tom Chacko manhandled them during the filming of the movie. The incident happened when the local people of Kalamassery HMT colony questioned the crew of the film regarding dumping waste while filming. Later the police intervened and set end to things.

 Editing of subtitles by Netflix 
On 12 September 2022, a day after the film's streaming release, the subtitling company Fill in the Blanks through their social media handles expressed their dissatisfaction of Netflix editing their English subtitles for the film which were already approved by the film's writer.  Upon the incident, several subtitle artists from various countries shared similar experiences they faced in the past, and showed solidarity to the company. Netflix is yet to respond on this.

 Censoring by Netflix 
After the movie began streaming on Netflix, It has been reported that the word "beef" was completely cut from the Kannada version of Thallumaala. The word "beef" enters into the dialogues in many parts of the movie. However, "beef" was completely removed from the dialogue and subtitles in Kannada version, "mutton" and "curry" were used instead.  Audience and critics have come forward on social media against Netflix, saying Netflix has a history of  censoring "beef" from movies and the like. Some critics even pointed out that Netflix is doing "such degrading work" out of fear of cow vigilante organizations, working with the support of Government of Karnataka.

 Accusation by Animation Team 
On 11 September 2022, The film's animation team Studio Kokaachi accused the makers of the film for repeatedly not crediting them in titles. After Thallumaala dropped on Netflix, the animation team said that “powers-that-be had refused to acknowledge their contribution and share the names of the artistes who had worked on the film's animated scenes, which were wide praised by the audience and to an extent gave the film its unique style". The makers of the movie then apologized "for missing" their names on the title credits, explaining "it was an honest mistake from our side". Kokaachi'', however, stated that they first spotted the error when the movie had released in theatres and they found out that their names were missing from the end credits, the makers had "ample time and opportunity to correct the mistake".

References

External links 
 

Films directed by Khalid Rahman
Indian action comedy films
Films shot in Kannur
Films shot in Thalassery
2022 action comedy films